Deh Kabud-e Chovari (also Romanized as Deh Kabūd-e Chovārī; also known as Deh-i-Kabūd, Deh Kabūd, and Deh Qabūt) is a village in Nurali Rural District, in the Central District of Delfan County, Lorestan Province, Iran. At the 2006 census, its population was 798, in 173 families.

References 

Towns and villages in Delfan County